Ensi may refer to:

Title

 Ensign (rank), (as an abbreviation of)
 Ensí, a Mesopotamian royal title in various Babylonian city states

Entities

 Ensi (rapper), an Italian rapper
 Ensi, Iran, a village in West Azerbaijan Province, Iran
 ensî, (plural) the Old High German word for pagan deities

Organizations

 Evolution and the Nature of Science Institutes (ENSI), Indiana University program to help high school biology teachers cope with the problems associated with teaching evolution
 Eidgenössisches Nuklearsicherheitsinspektorat (ENSI), the Swiss Federal Nuclear Safety Inspectorate